Copelatus pumilus is a species of diving beetle. It is part of the genus Copelatus in the subfamily Copelatinae of the family Dytiscidae. It was described by Régimbart in 1895.

References

pumilus
Beetles described in 1895